Dowlatabad-e Sofla (also Romanized as Dowlatābād-e Soflá) is a village in Mahidasht Rural District, Mahidasht District, Kermanshah County, Kermanshah Province, Iran. At the 2006 census, its population was 100, in 20 families.

References 

Populated places in Kermanshah County